Porto Bello is a historic home located at Drayden, St. Mary's County, Maryland.  It is a -story gambrel-roofed Flemish bond brick house built after 1742. It is located on a portion of the first grant of land recorded in the province of Maryland: West St. Mary's Manor, one of the nine original Maryland Manors. Its name commemorates the Battle of Porto Bello (1739).

The house was listed on the National Register of Historic Places in 1972.

References

External links
, including undated photo, at Maryland Historical Trust

Houses on the National Register of Historic Places in Maryland
Houses in St. Mary's County, Maryland
National Register of Historic Places in St. Mary's County, Maryland